The 2019 Giro di Sicilia was the twenty-fourth edition of the Giro di Sicilia, a men's multi-stage bicycle race. It was held between 3 and 6 June 2019 and was organised as a 2.1 event in the UCI Europe Tour. The race was won by Brandon McNulty.

Route

Teams
One UCI WorldTeam, ten UCI Professional Continental teams, and seven UCI Continental teams made up the eighteen teams that participated in the race. Of these teams, three teams (and ) entered only six riders each, while the rest entered seven each. 77 of the 123 riders in the race finished.

UCI WorldTeams

 

UCI Professional Continental Teams

 
 
 
 
 
 
 
 
 
  

UCI Continental Teams

Stages

Stage 1
3 April 2019 – Catania to Milazzo,

Stage 2
4 April 2019 – Capo d'Orlando to Palermo,

Stage 3
5 April 2019 – Caltanissetta to Ragusa,

Stage 4
6 April 2019 – Giardini Naxos to Etna,

Classification leadership

Final classification standings

General classification

Points classification

Mountains classification

Young rider classification

References 

2019 in Italian sport
2019 UCI Europe Tour
Giro di Sicilia